John Miesel (February 10, 1883 – October 4, 1948) was an American gymnast. He competed in the four events at 1904 Summer Olympics.

References

External links
 

1883 births
1948 deaths
American male artistic gymnasts
Olympic gymnasts of the United States
Gymnasts at the 1904 Summer Olympics
Place of birth missing